Pinoak is an unincorporated community in Mercer County, West Virginia, United States.

The community was named after the nearby Pinoak School.

References

Unincorporated communities in Mercer County, West Virginia
Unincorporated communities in West Virginia